Dayton, Ohio - 19 Something and 5 is a 2000 EP by Guided by Voices. "This is a song about smoking dope, having cookouts, and hanging out in the West Side, it's called Dayton, Ohio 19 Something circa and 5", as put by front-man, Robert Pollard. The track is also featured on the album Tonics and Twisted Chasers.

Track listing
Side A
"Dayton, Ohio - 19 Something and 5 (Live)"
Side B
"Travels"
"No Welcome Wagons"
"Selective Service"

References

2000 EPs
Guided by Voices EPs